Zuchrizal Abdul Gamal (born June 6, 1988) is an Indonesian professional footballer who played as a right back.

Career

Persiter Ternate 
Gamal started his football career for Persiter Ternate when still a student in 2005. Gamal helped bring his team to the third place Liga Indonesia First Division in 2005, once led the team promotion to the First Division.

Mitra Kukar 
Gamal finally docked with Mitra Kukar, who was promoted to the ISL 2011/2012

Semen Padang 
On November 16, 2014, he signed with Semen Padang.

Mitra Kukar 
At the tournament Presidents Cup 2015, Semen Padang lends him along with his partner, namely Hendra Bayauw, Saepulloh Maulana, Airlangga Sucipto and Eka Ramdani to the club Mitra Kukar is a club that once defended in 2011. After the contract expired at Semen Padang, he went back to his old club, namely Mitra Kukar. Together with Mitra Kukar, he made history by winning the Sudirman Cup in 2015, although in the final he did not play because of a red card he earned while playing in the semi-final 2nd leg against Arema Cronus dated January 17, 2016 in Kanjuruhan Stadium, Malang. In the final which took place at GBK Stadium, Jakarta,
Mitra Kukar beat Semen Padang F.C. 2-1

References

External links 
 

1988 births
Living people
People from Ternate
Sportspeople from North Maluku
Indonesian footballers
Liga 1 (Indonesia) players
Indonesian Premier Division players
Persiter Ternate players
Mitra Kukar players
Semen Padang F.C. players
Association football fullbacks